Porina is a genus of bryozoans belonging to the family Porinidae.

The species of this genus are found in Europe, Northern America, Malesia, Australia.

Species

Species:

Porina abduazimovae 
Porina acutimargo 
Porina africana

References

Bryozoan genera